Eremophila spinescens is a flowering plant in the figwort family, Scrophulariaceae and is endemic to Western Australia. It is a low, spreading, rigid, spiny shrub with small leaves and lilac to dark purple flowers.

Description
The leaves are arranged alternately and are widely scattered along the branches, except on the short side branches where they are clustered.

The petal tube is lilac to dark purple on the outside and white to cream-coloured with bands of blackish-purple inside the tube. The outside of the petal tube and lobes is hairy, the inside surface of the lobes is glabrous and the inside of the tube is filled with woolly hairs. The 4 stamens are enclosed in the petal tube.

Taxonomy and naming 
The species was first formally described by Robert Chinnock in 1980 and the description was published in Journal of the Adelaide Botanic Garden. The specific epithet is from the Latin spinescens, 'spinescent', referring to the branch tips and spiny habit of this species.

Distribution and habitat
Spiny poverty bush grows in sand, clay or loam soils between Wiluna and Carnegie Station in the Gascoyne, Little Sandy Desert and Murchison biogeographic regions.

Conservation
Eremophila spinescensis classified as "not threatened" by the Western Australian Government Department of Parks and Wildlife.

Use in horticulture
Caution needs to be exercised when deciding where to grow this small shrub as its branches become spiny as they age. It is nevertheless an attractive plant with small, dark-green leaves and lilac-coloured flowers. It can be propagated from cuttings and grown in a well-drained soil in full sun. It is very drought tolerant, rarely needing watering during a long dry spell, although it may lose some leaves and it is generally frost tolerant when mature.

References

Eudicots of Western Australia
spinescens
Endemic flora of Western Australia
Plants described in 1980
Taxa named by Robert Chinnock